Seneca County Airport  is a county-owned public-use airport located  southwest of the central business district of Tiffin, a city in Seneca County, Ohio, United States.

Facilities and aircraft
Seneca County Airport has one runway designated 6/24 with a 4000 x 75 ft (1219.2 x 22.9 m) asphalt pavement. For the 12-month period ending December 4, 2006, the airport had 60,165 aircraft operations, an average of 164 per day: 48% general aviation, 51% air taxi and <1% military. At that time there were 64 aircraft based at this airport: 75% single-engine, 23% multi-engine and 2% jet.

References

External links
 

Airports in Ohio
Buildings and structures in Seneca County, Ohio
Transportation in Seneca County, Ohio